Harold Davies (5 December 1898 – 29 March 1976) was a Welsh rugby union player who represented Wales and the British Lions. Davies played club rugby for Newport and captained the team in the 1925/26 season.

Rugby career
Davies was first chosen to represent Wales in the 1922 Five Nations Championship game against France, but was replaced shortly before kick off, along with Swansea's Frank Palmer, by Cliff Richards and Islwyn Evans. Davies was selected on one occasion in 1924 to represent Wales in an infamous game against Scotland at Inverleith. Wales was completely outclassed letting in eight tries. Although Davies was never selected to play for Wales again he was chosen to represent the British Lions in their 1924 tour of South Africa. The 1924 tour was notorious for the amount of injuries suffered by the tourists, and Davies was called out at the late in the tour as a replacement. He played in just one game against South Africa, in the second test.

International matches played
Wales
  1924

British Isles
  1924

Bibliography

References

1898 births
1976 deaths
Rugby union players from Newport, Wales
Welsh rugby union players
British & Irish Lions rugby union players from Wales
Newport RFC players
Wales international rugby union players
Rugby union centres